Bandits is a 1982 fixed shooter written by Tony and Benny Ngo for the Apple II and published by Sirius Software. The game is a clone of Taito's 1980 Stratovox arcade video game where the goal is to prevent aliens from stealing objects. Bandits was ported to the Atari 8-bit family, Commodore 64, and VIC-20.

Gameplay
Supplies stored on the moon–represented as fruit–are coveted by alien invaders. Various types of those bandits enter, via a mothership, in waves. The player's job is to shoot them using the spaceship at the bottom of the screen. If an invader reached the bottom right part of the screen, it steals an item. The player can activate a shield which makes the spaceship invulnerable for a limited time. There are 28 levels.

Reception
David H. Ahl found the game to be "sensational" and "great fun." He liked the wide range of alien types, but found the best control scheme to be the one the fewest people were likely to use: an Atari CX40 joystick connected through a Sirius Joyport. This option allows pushing forward on the stick to activate shields; it isn't available with an Apple joystick.

Dawn Gordon, reviewing the Atari 8-bit version for Electronic Games, wrote: "Bandits has a very annoying flaw. The time lapse from when the disk is booted to when play actually begins is three minutes and seven seconds! As each level is completed throughout the game, the computer pauses to load additional information, and the process can take up to 12 seconds."

See also
Spider Fighter

References

External links

C64 gameplay video
Addison Wesley Book of Atari Software 1984
1984 Software Encyclopedia from Electronic Games
Review in Softline
Review in Softalk
Review in Ahoy!
Review in Electronic Fun with Computers & Games

1982 video games
Apple II games
Atari 8-bit family games
Commodore 64 games
Fixed shooters
Single-player video games
Sirius Software games
VIC-20 games
Video game clones
Video games developed in the United States
Video games set in outer space